Azaxia hamula is a moth of the family Notodontidae. It is found in Colombia and north-eastern Ecuador.

The length of the forewings is 22–23 mm. The ground colour of the forewings is a mixture of purplish grey, salmon, and white scales. The ground colour of the hindwings is glossy white, with a suffusion of purplish grey scales along the outer margin.

Etymology
The species name is derived from Latin hamulus, a diminutive form of hamus and refers to the hook at the apex of the aedeagus.

References

Moths described in 2011
Notodontidae
Moths of South America